Cumbrians Opposed to a Radioactive Environment (CORE) is a non-political, non-profit organisation, located in Barrow-in-Furness, which since 1980 has campaigned against all aspects of the operation of Sellafield, formerly Windscale, and the site of the 1957 reactor fire. Issues of current interest are radioactive air and sea discharges, resultant environmental contamination, and the health detriment to local communities and wildlife. As well as preparing compensation cases for Sellafield workers, CORE has taken part in many direct action campaigns which have resulted in a string of injunctions.

References

External links

Political advocacy groups in England
Anti–nuclear power movement
Environmental organisations based in England
Anti-nuclear organizations
Radioactive waste
Environment of Cumbria
Anti-nuclear movement in England
Organisations based in Cumbria
1980 establishments in England